Zell Bryan Miller (February 24, 1932 – March 23, 2018) was an American author and politician from the state of Georgia. A member of the Democratic Party, Miller served as lieutenant governor from 1975 to 1991, 79th governor of Georgia from 1991 to 1999, and as U.S. senator from 2000 to 2005.

Miller was a conservative Democrat as a senator in the 2000s, after being more liberal as governor in the 1990s. In 2004, he supported Republican president George W. Bush against Democratic nominee John Kerry in the presidential election. Miller was a keynote speaker at both major American political parties' national conventions–Democratic in 1992 and Republican in 2004.

He did not seek re-election to the Senate in 2004. After retiring from the Senate, he joined the law firm McKenna Long & Aldridge as a non-lawyer professional in the firm's national government affairs practice.  Miller was also a Fox News contributor. After he left his office in 2005, no Georgia Democrats were elected to the United States Senate for 16 years until Raphael Warnock won Miller's former seat in the 2020–2021 special runoff election and Jon Ossoff won the Class 2 seat in the 2020–2021 regular runoff election.

Early life and military career
Miller was born in the small mountain town of Young Harris, Georgia. His father, Stephen Grady Miller (1891–1932), was a teacher who died of cerebral meningitis when Miller was a 17-day-old infant, and the future politician was raised by his widowed mother, Birdie Bryan (1893–1980). He had a sister, Jane, who was six years older than he. As a child, Miller lived both in Young Harris and Atlanta. Miller received an associate degree from Young Harris College in his home town and later attended Emory University.

Less than a month after the Korean War armistice, Miller wound up in a drunk tank in the mountains of North Georgia. Miller stated later that this incident was the lowest point of his life. Upon his release, Miller enlisted in the Marines. During his three years in the United States Marine Corps, Miller attained the rank of sergeant. He often referred to the value of his experience in the Marine Corps in his writing and stump speeches. 
In his book on the subject, entitled Corps Values: Everything You Need to Know I Learned in the Marines, he wrote:

After serving in the Marines, Miller enrolled in 1956 and earned bachelor's and master's degrees in history from the University of Georgia.  He taught history at Young Harris College following his graduation from the University of Georgia.

Political career

Miller's parents were both involved in local politics in the North Georgia mountains. Miller, a Democrat, taught history and political science at Young Harris College, before becoming mayor of Young Harris from 1959 to 1960, and was elected to two terms as a Georgia state senator from 1961 until 1964. In 1964 and 1966, he unsuccessfully sought the Democratic nomination for the United States House of Representatives. He endorsed segregation in both races. He later served in state government as the executive secretary to Governor Lester Maddox and in the Georgia Democratic Party, and was the Georgia state chairman for Walter Mondale's 1984 presidential campaign.

Miller's first experience in the executive branch of government was as Chief of Staff for Georgia governor Lester Maddox. He was elected Lieutenant Governor of Georgia in 1974, serving four terms from 1975 to 1991, through the terms of Governors George Busbee and Joe Frank Harris, making him the longest-serving lieutenant governor in Georgia history. In 1980, Miller unsuccessfully challenged Herman Talmadge in the Democratic primary for his seat in the United States Senate. Some analysts surmised that Miller so severely weakened Talmadge in the primaries, which was considered one of Georgia's nastiest, that it caused Talmadge to narrowly lose in the fall to Georgia's first Republican elected to the Senate since Reconstruction, Mack Mattingly.

Governor
Miller was elected governor of Georgia in 1990, defeating Republican Johnny Isakson (who later became his successor as U.S. Senator) after defeating Atlanta Mayor Andrew Young and future Governor Roy Barnes in the primary. Miller campaigned on the concept of term limits and pledged to seek only a single term as governor. He later ran for and won re-election in 1994. James Carville was Miller's campaign manager.

In 1991, Miller endorsed Governor Bill Clinton of Arkansas for president. Miller gave the keynote speech at the 1992 Democratic National Convention at Madison Square Garden in New York City. In two oft-recalled lines, Miller said that President George H. W. Bush "just doesn't get it," and he remarked of a statement by Vice President Dan Quayle:

Twelve years later, Miller would give the keynote address at the opposing party's convention, also held at New York's Madison Square Garden, in 2004.

As governor, Miller was perhaps best known for getting a law passed in Georgia known as "two strikes and you're out", in stark contrast to three strikes law, which is known as the Seven-deadly-sins law. The law was passed in April 1994, although it had been advocated by Miller for many years previously. It was approved by voters on November 8, 1994, and was signed into law by then Governor Zell Miller on December 15, 1994, and went into effect on January 1, 1995. The law is codified and found under Title 17, Chapter 10, Section 7 (OCGA Section 17-10-7) of the Official Code of Georgia Annotated. The law states that those convicted of second-degree murder, armed robbery, and kidnapping (of a person 14 years of age or older) must serve a minimum term of 10 years in prison, and those convicted of rape, kidnapping of a minor under 14 years old, aggravated sexual battery, aggravated sodomy and aggravated child molestation must serve a minimum term of not less than 25 years in prison. First-degree murder is punishable by death, life without parole, or life in prison with no parole until the offender serves at least 30 years in prison. These crimes are known in Georgia as the "seven deadly sins". Any person convicted for the second time of any of these offenses will automatically be sentenced to life imprisonment without the possibility of parole.

As governor, Miller was a staunch promoter of public education. He helped found the HOPE Scholarship, which paid for the college tuition of Georgia students who both established a GPA of 3.0 in high school and maintained the same while in college, and who were from families earning less than $66,000 per year. The HOPE Scholarships were funded by revenue collected from the state lottery. In December 1995, his office announced a proposal for $1 billion more in spending on education. HOPE won praise from national Democratic leaders. The HOPE Scholarship program still to this day provides Georgia students with an opportunity to attend a public college or university, who otherwise may have no opportunity to do so.

Upon leaving the governor's office in January 1999, Miller accepted teaching positions at Young Harris College, Emory University, and the University of Georgia. He was a visiting professor at all three institutions when he was appointed to the U.S. Senate.

Senate

Miller's successor as governor, Roy Barnes, appointed Miller to a U.S. Senate seat following the death of Republican Sen. Paul Coverdell in July 2000. Although the Democratic Party's historic control of Georgia politics had been waning for years, Miller remained popular. He defeated former U.S. Senator Mack Mattingly in a special election to keep the seat in November 2000.

Miller often supported Republicans and criticized Democrats during his tenure in the Senate.  He supported much of George W. Bush's agenda, including tax cuts and oil drilling in the Arctic National Wildlife Refuge.  He supported anti-abortion policies as a senator, after supporting abortion rights as governor. He also supported a constitutional amendment banning gay marriage as senator, after inviting the Gay Games to Atlanta as governor.  However, Miller remained a Democrat, saying, "I'll be a Democrat 'til the day I die." Miller campaigned for fellow Georgia Democrat Max Cleland in his 2002 re-election campaign against Republican Congressman Saxby Chambliss, despite their ideological differences.

Miller argued in his book A National Party No More: The Conscience of a Conservative Democrat (authored and published in 2003) that the Democratic Party lost its majority because it does not stand for the same ideals that it did in the era of John F. Kennedy. He argued that the Democratic Party, as it now stands, is a far left-wing party that is out of touch with the America of today and that the Republican Party now embraces the conservative Democratic ideals that he has held for so long.  The book spent nine weeks in the New York Times Best Seller list for hardback non-fiction, rising to fourth position.

In 2003, Miller announced that he would not seek re-election after completing his term in the Senate. He also announced that he would support President George W. Bush in the 2004 presidential election rather than any of the nine candidates then competing for his own party's nomination. Shortly after announcing his retirement, Miller began to call for the repeal of the Seventeenth Amendment to the United States Constitution, which allows people to directly elect US Senators, rather than having US Senators be elected by  state legislatures.  Democratic Congresswoman Denise Majette sought to fill Miller's Senate seat, but lost the 2004 election to Republican Johnny Isakson.

2004 election support for Republicans
In his keynote speech at the 2004 Republican National Convention, delivered on September 1, 2004, Miller criticized the state of the Democratic Party. He said, "No pair has been more wrong, more loudly, more often than the two senators from Massachusetts – Ted Kennedy and John Kerry." He also criticized John Kerry's Senate voting record, claiming that Kerry's votes against bills for defense and weapon systems indicated support for weakening U.S. military strength.

The speech was well received by the convention attendees, especially the Georgia delegates. Conservative commentator Michael Barone compared the speech to the views and ideology of Andrew Jackson.

Miller's combative reaction to post-speech media interviews received almost as much attention as the speech itself. First, in an interview with CNN, Miller had a dispute with Judy Woodruff, Wolf Blitzer, and Jeff Greenfield when they questioned him on his speech, particularly on whether he had misinterpreted the context and full content of Kerry's votes, and the fact that Dick Cheney, as Defense Secretary, had opposed some of the same programs he attacked Kerry for voting against.

Shortly thereafter, Miller appeared in an interview with Chris Matthews on the MSNBC show Hardball. After Miller expressed irritation at Matthews' line of questioning, Matthews pressed Miller with the question, "Do you believe now – do you believe, Senator, truthfully, that John Kerry wants to defend the country with spitballs?" Miller angrily told Matthews to "get out of my face," and declared, "I wish we lived in the day where you could challenge a person to a duel." Miller later said about the interview, "That was terrible. I embarrassed myself. I'd rather it had not happened."

After Bush won the election of 2004, Miller referred to the Republican victories in that election (including a sweep of five open Senate seats in the South) as a sign that Democrats did not relate to most Americans. Calling for Democrats to change their message, he authored a column, which appeared in The Washington Times on November 4, 2004, in which he wrote:

Post-2004 endorsements
In 2008, after Barack Obama was elected president and Democrats increased their majorities in the House and Senate, he endorsed Republican Saxby Chambliss in the Senate run-off against Democrat Jim Martin and criticized Obama over "spreading the wealth."

In 2012, Miller served as the national co-chair to the campaign of Republican presidential candidate Newt Gingrich. The same year, Miller endorsed Doug Collins, the Republican candidate in the 9th District of Georgia congressional race.

In 2014, Miller endorsed major Georgia candidates in both parties. He made a TV ad supporting the candidacy of Michelle Nunn, who was the Democratic nominee for the U.S. Senate. He appeared in the ad with her, saying he was "angry about what's going on in Washington, partisanship over patriotism" and praised Nunn as a "bridge-builder, not a bridge-burner." However, he also endorsed incumbent Republican governor Nathan Deal for reelection.

Life after politics
In August 2005, President Bush appointed Miller to the American Battle Monuments Commission.

In 2005, Miller was elected to the board of directors of the National Rifle Association.

Miller was a speaker at "Justice Sunday II," an event organized by conservative Christian evangelicals to combat alleged liberal bias in the federal judiciary of the United States. The event was held in Nashville, Tennessee on August 14, 2005, and featured Tony Perkins and James Dobson. Miller criticized the United States Supreme Court, saying that it had "removed prayer from our public schools ... legalized the barbaric killing of unborn babies and it is ready to discard like an outdated hula hoop the universal institution of marriage between a man and a woman."

The Student Learning Center (SLC) at the University of Georgia was renamed to the Zell B. Miller Learning Center (Miller Learning Center or MLC for short) in October 2008.

Miller's health took a downward turn in the late 2000s when he developed Parkinson's disease and other health concerns, which ended in various complications. In 2016, Miller's grandson, Bryan Miller, started the Miller Institute Foundation as a way to preserve and promote his grandfather's legacy. By October 2017, Miller had officially retired from public life and was undergoing treatment for Parkinson's.

Death
Miller died on March 23, 2018, at his home in Young Harris, Georgia, from complications of Parkinson's disease. His state funeral was held in Atlanta on March 28 with incumbent governor Nathan Deal, U.S. secretary of agriculture Sonny Perdue, U.S. senator Johnny Isakson, former senator Max Cleland, former lieutenant governor Pierre Howard and three former U.S. presidents—Jimmy Carter, Bill Clinton and George W. Bush—in attendance.

Awards
In 1998, he received an honorary degree in Doctor of Laws from Oglethorpe University.

Published works

 
 
 
 
 
  (foreword by Miller)
 
  (foreword by Miller)
 
  (foreword by Miller)

See also
 Conservative Democrat

Further reading

References

External links

 

|-

 
|-

|-

|-

|-

|-

|-

|-

1932 births
2018 deaths
20th-century American male writers
20th-century American non-fiction writers
20th-century American politicians
20th-century Methodists
21st-century American male writers
21st-century American non-fiction writers
21st-century American politicians
21st-century Methodists
1992 United States presidential electors
Methodists from Georgia (U.S. state)
American male non-fiction writers
American political writers
Deaths from Parkinson's disease
Democratic Party United States senators from Georgia (U.S. state)
Democratic Party governors of Georgia (U.S. state)
Emory University faculty
Fox News people
Democratic Party Georgia (U.S. state) state senators
Lieutenant Governors of Georgia (U.S. state)
Mayors of places in Georgia (U.S. state)
Military personnel from Georgia (U.S. state)
Neurological disease deaths in Georgia (U.S. state)
People from Towns County, Georgia
Politicians from Atlanta
United States Marines
University of Georgia alumni
University of Georgia faculty
Writers from Atlanta
Young Harris College alumni